Union Sportive et Culturelle de Bananier, (English: Sports and Cultural Union of Bananier or other wise known as U.S.C. de Bananier is a Guadeloupean football club based in Capesterre-Belle-Eau. The club plays in the Guadeloupe Division of Honor, the top tier of football in Guadeloupe.

References

External links 
Official Website
FFF Profile

Football clubs in Guadeloupe